James Arvey Ibbotson (born January 21, 1947) is an American musician who is best known as a longtime member of the Nitty Gritty Dirt Band. He has also released albums as a solo artist, as a member of the Wild Jimbos, and with John McEuen.

Career
Ibbotson was a member of the Evergreen Blueshoes in 1969, alongside future Byrds musician Skip Battin. After spending a number of years with the Nitty Gritty Dirt Band, as well as being a solo artist, Ibbotson joined the Wild Jimbos in the early 1990s.

In 1998 Ibbotson released Ibbinet Companion#1.5. He was writing a weekly column for his website, telling stories about his adventures on the road, living in Colorado, trying to stop smoking, and general philosophies on life. He wanted to release the songs that he wrote around that time as an audio companion to his Internet stories. He sang and played guitar and mandolin. One year later, Ibbotson released This Is It with Tracy McLain. He wrote three songs on this album, "Mrs. Hiss's House", "Another Daddy", and "I Was a Fool".

In May 2009, the Highland Ranch Herald reported Ibbotson was working on new material and performing locally.

Discography

Albums 

Album information from liner notes unless otherwise noted.

Non-album tracks 
The "Ballad of the Monon Bell" celebrates the annual football game between DePauw University and Wabash College, a rivalry which dates back to 1890 and awards the winner the prized railroad bell. Jimmy Ibbotson, a 1969 graduate of DePauw, recorded "The Ballad of the Monon Bell". The song can be downloaded for free from the DePauw website.

Put the Wet Stuff on the Red Stuff
In 2004 the Aspen Fire Protection District produced the DVD Put the Wet Stuff on the Red Stuff, a 48-minute documentary film on the history of the Aspen Volunteer Fire Department. Ibbotson provides the narration. The AVFD traces its roots back to the silver boom days in Aspen. In 1881 the town devoted $200 to provide a fire department. The film was written by Ben Gagnon and produced by Darryl Grob.

References

1947 births
20th-century American singers
21st-century American singers
American male singer-songwriters
American country rock singers
American country singer-songwriters
American rock musicians
Living people
Nitty Gritty Dirt Band members
20th-century American male singers
21st-century American male singers